Brain matter may refer to:

Brain tissue generally, or, specifically:
Gray matter, containing numerous cell bodies
White matter, primarily made up of myelinated axons